Kendriya Vidyalaya No.1 AFA Dundigal Hyderabad (KV No.1 AFA, Dundigul, established 24 March 1977) is a school situated within the Air Force Academy, Dundigul Hyderabad, India. Run by the Kendriya Vidyalaya Sangathan, an autonomous body formed by the Ministry of Human Resource Development, Government of India, New Delhi.
 
Started in 1977, the Vidyalaya has classes from I to XII with an enrollment of 900 with science and commerce streams at the Plus-Two level.
 
The Vidyalaya is affiliated to the CBSE and follows the 10+2 pattern of education. Apart from the teaching learning process, the students take part in co-curricular activities, sports and games, club activities, work experience, Scouts and Guides, computer education, vocational training, adventure programmes and value education.

Sports activities 

KV 1 AFA encourages its students to take part in sports and activities. The school organises a sports day annually in which the houses of the school take part in intra-school sports events. The school has won trophies in football, cricket, athletics and other games at regional and national level.

The school has two children parks which provide recreation to the primary students.

KV 1 AFA is also equipped with sports facilities as below:

Student activities 

The school encourages the students to take part in national level competitions and examinations.
A few student activities are listed below:
 Educational trips
 Green Olympiad
 Mathematics Olympiad
 National Level essay and painting competitions
 National Talent Search exam
 Scouting activities
 Think Quest
 Youth Parliament
 Science Olympiad
 National Cyber Olympiad
 International Mathematics Olympiad
 KVS IYC 2011 competitions
 National Children's Science Congress

Campus learning aids and facilities 
A few are listed below :
 2Mbit/s campus broadband access
 Art room
 Audio visual room with OHP, LCD projectors and Smart Boards
 Four computer labs
 Intel Technology Aided Learning (TAL) Project.
 Junior science lab for primary students.
 Library of 20,000 volumes and 30 national and international publications.
 Resources Room, for both primary and secondary students.
 Three Science labs for secondary and higher students.
 Mathematics Lab
 Sports room
 Hall (Yoga and functions)

See also 
 Kendriya Vidyalaya No. 2 AFA, Dundigal
 Kendriya Vidyalaya Sangathan
 List of Kendriya Vidyalaya schools
 List of Kendriya Vidyalaya Alumni Associations
 https://archive.today/20140629124657/http://interestinglyawsome.blogspot.in/

References

External links
 Official website

Kendriya Vidyalayas
Schools in Hyderabad, India
Schools in Telangana
Educational institutions established in 1977
1977 establishments in Andhra Pradesh